Nguru may refer to:

 Pila Nguru, an aboriginal people of Australia
 Nguru (flute), a small Māori nose flute from New Zealand
 Nguru, Nigeria, a town and LGA in Yobe State
 Hadejia-Nguru wetlands, northern Nigeria
 Nguru Lake, a lake which forms part of the aforementioned wetlands
 Nguru Mountains, a mountain range in Tanzania